"Die Gattung Nepenthes: Eine monographische Skizze" (lit. "The genus Nepenthes: A monographic sketch") is a German-language monograph by Günther Beck von Mannagetta und Lerchenau on the tropical pitcher plants of the genus Nepenthes. It was published in 1895 in four parts, spread over the March, April, May and June issues of Wiener Illustrirte Garten-Zeitung.

Content
Beck recognised and enumerated 67 major taxa, almost half of which were hybrids. Additionally, seven taxa and unnamed horticultural hybrids are listed at the end of the work under "Ungenügend bekannte Arten, Mischarten" (insufficiently known species, mixed species).

Beck described four new species: N. fallax (later synonymised with N. stenophylla, although this is disputed), N. hispida, N. smithii (later synonymised with N. distillatoria), and N. spuria (later synonymised with N. northiana). Beck was also the first to publish N. sumatrana under its present binomial combination, although he introduced it under the entry for N. maxima with the words "Hierzu gehört als Varietät: N. sumatrana" (this includes a variety: N. sumatrana).

Beck also introduced a number of new varieties. These included the species varieties N. albomarginata var. tomentella, N. albomarginata var. typica, N. gracilis var. longinodis, N. gracilis var. teysmanniana, N. rafflesiana var. ambigua, N. rafflesiana var. excelsior (later synonym of N. × hookeriana), and N. rafflesiana var. typica, as well as the hybrid variety N. hybrida var. typica (N. gracilis × N. khasiana).

A number of taxon names that Beck did not recognise as valid nonetheless appeared in print for the first time in his monograph. These included the species synonyms N. edgeworthii (synonym of N. edwardsiana) and N. speciosa (synonym of N. distillatoria), as well as the hybrid synonyms N. anerleyense and N. arnoldiense (both synonyms of N. × stewartii). While the name N. hookerae had first appeared in the literature four years prior to Beck's work, his concept of this hybrid involved a more complex cross (N. mirabilis × (N. rafflesiana × N. ampullaria)); it is considered a later synonym of N. × stewartii.

Beck was the first to unite N. edwardsiana with N. villosa, considering the former a variety or form of the latter. This synonymy stood until John Muirhead Macfarlane's 1908 monograph, "Nepenthaceae", and the species are considered distinct today. Beck thought that N. burkei likely represented a form of N. boschiana ("Hierzu gehört offenbar auch als Form: Nepenthes Burkeii"). He likewise considered N. singalana to be a form of N. sanguinea ("Kaum als Form von N. sanguinea abzutrennen ist: Nepenthes singalana").

Species
The following 67 taxa are enumerated and detailed in "Die Gattung Nepenthes". Only taxa considered hybrids by Beck are indicated here as such (therefore the natural hybrid  N. × trichocarpa is shown as a species). Taxon names are listed as they appear in Beck's monograph, including orthographic variants, though specific epithets derived from proper nouns have been decapitalised.

 N. alata
 N. albomarginata

 N. × amesiana
 N. ampullaria

 N. × atrosanguinea
 N. bicalcarata
 N. bongso
 N. boschiana
 N. celebica
 N. × chelsoni
 N. × cincta
 N. × coccinea
 N. × compacta
 N. × courtii
 N. × cylindrica
 N. destillatoria 
 N. × dicksoniana
 N. × dominii
 N. × dormanniana
 N. echinostoma
 N. × edinensis
 N. eustachya
 N. fallax
 N. gracilis

 N. × henryana
 N. × hibberdii
 N. hirsuta
 N. hispida
 N. × hookerae
 N. × hybrida

 N. × intermedia
 N. khasiana
 N. × lawrenciana
 N. lowii
 N. macrostachya

 N. madagascariensis
 N. × mastersiana
 N. maxima
 N. melamphora

 N. × mixta
 N. × morganiae
 N. northiana
 N. × outramiana
 N. × paradisae
 N. pervillei
 N. rafflesiana

 N. rajah
 N. × ratcliffiana
 N. reinwardtiana
 N. × robusta
 N. × rubro maculata
 N. × rufescens
 N. sanguinea
 N. × sedeni
 N. smithii
 ? N. spuria
 N. stenophylla
 N. × stewartii
 N. × superba
 N. tentaculata

 N. trichocarpa
 N. veitchii
 N. ventricosa
 N. vieillardii
 N. villosa
 N. × williamsii
 N. × wrigleyana

Ungenügend bekannte Arten, Mischarten
 N. bernaysii
 N. burbidgeae
 N. cristata
 N. × lyrata
 N. loddigesi
 N. veitchii × N. rafflesiana
 N. sanguinea × N. destillatoria

Infrageneric classification

The infrageneric classification in "Die Gattung Nepenthes" follows that introduced by Joseph Dalton Hooker in his 1873 monograph, "Nepenthaceae". Hooker placed N. pervillei in the monotypic Anourosperma, distinguishing it on the basis of its round seeds, and subsumed  all remaining species in the second section, Eunepenthes. Beck kept the two sections created by Hooker (spelling Anourosperma as Anowrosperma), but divided Eunepenthes into three subgroups: Apruinosae, Pruinosae, and Retiferae, the last containing only N. lowii.

References

External links
 Digitized version at the Biodiversity Heritage Library (part 2, part 3, part 4)

Nepenthes literature
1895 documents
Biology papers
1895 in biology